Sakeni is the river of western Georgia, in the north-east of Abkhazia. It originates in the Caucasus Mountains, in the eastern part of Upper Abkhazia and flows south-west to the Kodori river, entering it north of the village of Martskhena Gentsvishi. The river is mainly fed by rain, snow, and glacier runoff of the Caucasus Mountains as well as by underground water sources.

Notes

References 

Caucasus
Rivers of Georgia (country)